Marcos Andres Giron (born July 24, 1993) is an American professional tennis player. He achieved a career-high singles ranking of No. 49 on 16 May 2022 and a doubles ranking of No. 194 on August 1, 2022. He won the boys' singles in the Ojai Tennis Tournament in 2009 and the men’s invitational in 2011. In 2014, Giron won the singles title at the 2014 NCAA Division I Tennis Championships for UCLA.

Professional career

2020: First US Open win & top 100 debut
Giron reached the second round of a major at the 2020 US Open where he won his first match against Marc Polmans in five sets and at the French Open for the first time in his career.

In November, Giron recorded his first top-ten win against seventh seed Matteo Berrettini at the Paris Masters.

2021: Major third round, Olympics & top 60 debuts
Giron started his 2021 season at the Murray River Open, an event that was organized as a lead-up tournament to the Australian Open due to other tournaments in Australia being cancelled as a result from the COVID-19 pandemic. He beat 10th seed, Adrian Mannarino, in the second round. He lost in the third round to eighth seed and eventual champion, Dan Evans. He participated in the main draw as a direct entry at the Australian Open for a second consecutive year. He lost in the first round to sixth seed and world No. 7, Alexander Zverev, in four sets.

At the Open Sud de France, Giron was defeated in the first round by qualifier Tallon Griekspoor. Getting past qualifying at the Rotterdam Open, he was eliminated in the first round by fourth seed, world No. 8, and eventual champion, Andrey Rublev.

In June, Giron reached the third round of a major at the French Open for the first time in his career.

At Halle, Giron reached his first quarterfinal at an ATP 500 level tournament as a qualifier where he was defeated by Félix Auger-Aliassime. As a result of this good run, he reached a then career-high of No. 65 on June 21, 2021.

Giron made the second round at the Olympics, beating Norbert Gombos before losing to Kei Nishikori in three sets.

In September at the Sofia Open, Giron reached his fourth quarterfinal of the season (with quarterfinal appearances in Halle, Metz and Winston-Salem) after defeating third seed Alex de Minaur in the second round. He later beat 8th seed John Millman in 70 minutes to move into his first career ATP tour-level semifinal, where he lost to second seed Gaël Monfils. As a result, he reached a new career-high ranking in the top 60, at world No. 59 on October 4, 2021.

2022: Top 50 debut & Maiden tour final
Giron started his 2022 season at the first edition of the Melbourne Summer Set 1. He lost in the first round to qualifier Ričardas Berankis. At the Sydney Classic, he was defeated in the first round by Australian wildcard Jordan Thompson. Ranked 66 at the Australian Open, he was beaten in the first round by 6th seed and eventual champion, Rafael Nadal.

Seeded 7th at the first edition of the Dallas Open, Giron upset top seed, world No. 19, and compatriot, Taylor Fritz, in the quarterfinals to reach his second ATP tour semifinal. He lost in his semifinal match to 4th seed and compatriot, Jenson Brooksby, in three sets, despite holding four match points. In Delray Beach, he was defeated in the second round by John Millman. At the Abierto Mexicano Telcel in Acapulco, he beat eighth seed and world No. 17, Pablo Carreño Busta, in the second round. He lost in the quarterfinals to third seed, world No. 4, and last year finalist, Stefanos Tsitsipas. At the Indian Wells Masters, he was eliminated in the first round by Lorenzo Musetti. In Miami, he lost in the first round to Márton Fucsovics.

Giron started his clay-court season at the U.S. Men's Clay Court Championships in Houston, Texas. He lost in the first round to sixth seed and compatriot, Frances Tiafoe. At the Monte-Carlo Masters, he was defeated in the first round by eventual finalist Alejandro Davidovich Fokina. In Barcelona, he lost in the first round to Federico Coria. At the BMW Open in Munich, he fell in the first round to Hugo Gaston. At the Madrid Open, he was beaten in the first round of qualifying by Alejandro Tabilo. On his debut at the Italian Open as a lucky loser, he upset 12th seed, world No. 15, and 2020 finalist, Diego Schwartzman, in the second round. He lost in the third round to eighth seed and world No. 9, Félix Auger-Aliassime. In Geneva, he lost in the first round to Ilya Ivashka. He made his top 50 debut on 16 May 2022. Ranked No. 49 at the French Open, he was defeated in the first round by 18th seed and world No. 21, Grigor Dimitrov.

Giron started his grass-court season at the BOSS Open in Stuttgart. He lost in the first round to German wildcard, Jan-Lennard Struff, despite having two match points in the third set tiebreak. At the Halle Open, he was defeated in the first round by fourth seed and world No. 9, Félix Auger-Aliassime. In Mallorca, he reached the quarterfinals where he lost to second seed, world No. 6, and eventual champion, Stefanos Tsitsipas. Ranked No. 65 at Wimbledon, he upset 24th seed and world No. 29, Holger Rune, in the first round. He lost in the second round to Alex Molčan.

Giron started his US Open series at the Atlanta Open. He lost in the first round to Kwon Soon-woo; he led by a break in the third set, but he was unable to get the victory. At the Citi Open in Washington, D.C., he was defeated in the first round by 2019 champion and eventual champion, Nick Kyrgios. Getting past qualifying at the National Bank Open in Montreal, he lost in the first round to 15th seed and world No. 18, Roberto Bautista Agut. Making it past qualifying at the Western & Southern Open, he beat fellow qualifier and 2019 finalist, David Goffin, in the first round. He was defeated in the second round by 15th seed and world No. 19, Bautista Agut. Ranked No. 56 at the US Open, he lost in the first round to 22nd seed, world No. 26, compatriot, and eventual semifinalist, Frances Tiafoe.

Seeded third at the San Diego Open, Giron reached his maiden ATP tour final after defeating top seed and world No. 25, Dan Evans, in his semifinal match. He lost in the final to 5th seed and compatriot, Brandon Nakashima.

Singles performance timeline

Current through the 2023 BNP Paribas Open.

ATP career finals

Singles: 1 (1 runner-up)

ATP Challenger and ITF Futures finals

Singles: 13 (8–5)

Doubles: 9 (5–4)

Record against other players

Record against top 10 players
Giron's record against players who have been ranked in the top 10, with those who are active in boldface. Only ATP Tour main draw matches are considered:

Wins over top 10 players 
He has a  record against players who were, at the time the match was played, ranked in the top 10.

Notes

References

External links

 
 

1993 births
Living people
American male tennis players
UCLA Bruins men's tennis players
Tennis players at the 2020 Summer Olympics
Tennis people from California
Olympic tennis players of the United States